Doon Naughton (11 September 1879 – 14 April 1964) was a New Zealand cricketer. He played in four first-class matches for Wellington from 1908 to 1912.

See also
 List of Wellington representative cricketers

References

External links
 

1879 births
1964 deaths
New Zealand cricketers
Wellington cricketers
Cricketers from Nelson, New Zealand